Amaranthus is a cosmopolitan genus of annual or short-lived perennial plants collectively known as amaranths. Some amaranth species are cultivated as leaf vegetables, pseudocereals, and ornamental plants. Catkin-like cymes of densely packed flowers grow in summer or autumn.
There are approximately 75 species in the genus, 10 of which are dioecious and native to North America with the remaining 65 monoecious species endemic to every continent (except Antarctica) from tropical lowlands to the Himalayas. Members of this genus share many characteristics and uses with members of the closely related genus Celosia. Amaranth grain is collected from the genus. The leaves of some species are also eaten.

Description 

Amaranth is a herbaceous plant or shrub that is either annual or perennial across the genus. Flowers vary interspecifically from the presence of 3 or 5 tepals and stamens, whereas a 7-porate pollen grain structure remains consistent across the family. Species across the genus contain concentric rings of vascular bundles, and fix carbon efficiently with a C4 photosynthetic pathway.

Amaranth has a primary root with deeper spreading secondary fibrous root structures. Inflorescences are in the form a large panicle that varies from terminal to axial, color, and sex. The tassel of fluorescence is either erect or bent and varies in width and length between species. Flowers are radially symmetric and either bisexual or unisexual with very small, bristly perianth and pointy bracts. Species in this genus are either monecious (e.g. A. hybridus,) or dioecious (e.g. A. palmeri). Fruits are in the form of capsules referred to as a unilocular pixdio that opens at maturity. The top (operculum) of the unilocular pixdio releases the urn that contains the seed. Seeds are circular form from 1 to 1.5 millimeters in diameter and range in color with a shiny, smooth seed coat. The panicle is harvested 200 days after cultivation with approximately 1,000 to 3,000 seeds harvested per gram.

Chemistry
Amaranth grain contains phytochemicals that are not defined as nutrients and may be antinutrient factors, such as polyphenols, saponins, tannins, and oxalates. These compounds are reduced in content and antinutrient effect by cooking.

Taxonomy 
Amaranthus shows a wide variety of morphological diversity among and even within certain species. Amaranthus is part of the Amaranthaceae that is part of the larger grouping of the Carophyllales. Although the family (Amaranthaceae) is distinctive, the genus has few distinguishing characters among the 75 species present across six continents. This complicates taxonomy and Amaranthus has generally been considered among systematists as a "difficult" genus and to hybridize often.

In 1955, Sauer classified the genus into two subgenera, differentiating only between monoecious and dioecious species: Acnida (L.) Aellen ex K.R. Robertson and Amaranthus. Although this classification was widely accepted, further infrageneric classification was (and still is) needed to differentiate this widely diverse group. Mosyakin and Robertson 1996 later divided into three subgenera: Acnida, Amaranthus, and Albersia. The support for the addition of the subdivision Albersia because of its  indehiscent fruits coupled with three elliptic to linear tepals to be exclusive characters to members of this subgenus. The classification of these groups are further supported with a combination of  floral characters, reproductive strategies, geographic distribution, and molecular evidence.

The phylogenies of Amaranthus using maximum parsimony and Bayesian analysis of nuclear and chloroplast genes suggest five clades within the genus: Diecious / Pumilus, Hybris, Galapagos, Eurasian/ South African, Australian (ESA), ESA + South American.

Amaranthus includes three recognised subgenera and 75 species, although species numbers are questionable due to hybridisation and species concepts. Infrageneric classification focuses on inflorescence, flower characters and whether a species is monoecious/dioecious, as in the Sauer (1955) suggested classification. Bracteole morphology present on the stem is used for taxonomic classification of Amaranth. Wild species have longer bracteoles compared to cultivated species. A modified infrageneric classification of Amaranthus includes three subgenera: Acnida, Amaranthus, and Albersia, with the taxonomy further differentiated by sections within each of the subgenera.

There is near certainty that A. hypochondriacus is the common ancestor to the cultivated grain species, however the later series of domestication to follow remains unclear. There has been opposing hypotheses of a single as opposed to multiple domestication events of the three grain species. There is evidence of phylogenetic and geographical support for clear groupings that indicate separate domestication events in South America and Central America. A. hybridus may derive from South America, whereas A. caudatus, A. hypochondriacus, and A. quentiensis are native to Central and North America.

Species 

Species include: 

 Amaranthus acanthochiton – greenstripe
 Amaranthus acutilobus – a synonym of Amaranthus viridis
 Amaranthus albus – white pigweed, tumble pigweed
 Amaranthus anderssonii
 Amaranthus arenicola – sandhill amaranth
 Amaranthus australis – southern amaranth
 Amaranthus bigelovii – Bigelow's amaranth
 Amaranthus blitoides – mat amaranth, prostrate amaranth, prostrate pigweed
 Amaranthus blitum – purple amaranth
 Amaranthus brownii – Brown's amaranth
 Amaranthus californicus – California amaranth, California pigweed
 Amaranthus cannabinus – tidal-marsh amaranth
 Amaranthus caudatus – love-lies-bleeding, pendant amaranth, tassel flower, quilete
 Amaranthus chihuahuensis – Chihuahuan amaranth
 Amaranthus crassipes – spreading amaranth
 Amaranthus crispus – crispleaf amaranth
 Amaranthus cruentus – purple amaranth, red amaranth, Mexican grain amaranth
 Amaranthus deflexus – large-fruit amaranth
 Amaranthus dubius – spleen amaranth, khada sag
 Amaranthus fimbriatus – fringed amaranth, fringed pigweed
 Amaranthus floridanus – Florida amaranth
 Amaranthus furcatus
 Amaranthus graecizans
 Amaranthus grandiflorus
 Amaranthus greggii – Gregg's amaranth
 Amaranthus hybridus – smooth amaranth, smooth pigweed, red amaranth
 Amaranthus hypochondriacus – Prince-of-Wales feather, prince's feather
 Amaranthus interruptus – Australian amaranth
 Amaranthus minimus
 Amaranthus mitchellii
 Amaranthus muricatus – African amaranth
 Amaranthus obcordatus – Trans-Pecos amaranth
 Amaranthus palmeri – Palmer's amaranth, Palmer pigweed, careless weed
 Amaranthus polygonoides – tropical amaranth
 Amaranthus powellii – green amaranth, Powell amaranth, Powell pigweed
 Amaranthus pringlei – Pringle's amaranth
 Amaranthus pumilus – seaside amaranth
 Amaranthus quitensis - Mucronate Amaranth
 Amaranthus retroflexus – red-root amaranth, redroot pigweed, common amaranth
 Amaranthus saradhiana
 Amaranthus scleranthoides – variously Amaranthus sclerantoides
 Amaranthus scleropoides – bone-bract amaranth
 Amaranthus spinosus – spiny amaranth, prickly amaranth, thorny amaranth
 Amaranthus standleyanus
 Amaranthus thunbergii – Thunberg's amaranth
 Amaranthus torreyi – Torrey's amaranth
 Amaranthus tricolor – Joseph's-coat
 Amaranthus tuberculatus – rough-fruit amaranth, tall waterhemp
 Amaranthus viridis – slender amaranth, green amaranth
 Amaranthus watsonii – Watson's amaranth
 Amaranthus wrightii – Wright's amaranth

Etymology 
Amarant is an archaic variant. The name was first applied to the related Celosia (Amaranthus and Celosia share long-lasting dried flowers), as Amaranthus plants were not yet known in Europe.

Ecology 
Amaranth weed species have an extended period of germination, rapid growth, and high rates of seed production, and have been causing problems for farmers since the mid-1990s. This is partially due to the reduction in tillage, reduction in herbicidal use and the evolution of herbicidal resistance in several species where herbicides have been applied more often. The following 9 species of Amaranthus are considered invasive and noxious weeds in the U.S and Canada: A. albus, A. blitoides, A. hybridus, A. palmeri, A. powellii, A. retroflexus, A. spinosus, A. tuberculatus, and A. viridis.

A new herbicide-resistant strain of A. palmeri has appeared; it is glyphosate-resistant and so cannot be killed by herbicides using the chemical. Also, this plant can survive in tough conditions. The species Amaranthus palmeri (Palmer amaranth) causes the greatest reduction in soybean yields and has the potential to reduce yields by 17-68% in field experiments. Palmer amaranth is among the "top five most troublesome weeds" in the southeast of the United States and has already evolved resistances to dinitroaniline herbicides and acetolactate synthase inhibitors. This makes the proper identification of Amaranthus species at the seedling stage essential for agriculturalists. Proper weed control needs to be applied before the species successfully colonizes in the crop field and causes significant yield reductions.

An evolutionary lineage of around 90 species within the genus has acquired the  carbon fixation pathway, which increases their photosynthetic efficiency. This probably occurred in the Miocene.

Uses 

All parts of the plant are considered edible, though some may have sharp spines that need to be removed before consumption.

Nutrition 

Uncooked amaranth grain by weight is 12% water, 65% carbohydrates (including 7% dietary fiber), 14% protein, and 7% fat (table). A  reference serving of uncooked amaranth grain provides  of food energy, and is a rich source (20% or more of the Daily Value, DV) of protein, dietary fiber, pantothenic acid, vitamin B6, folate, and several dietary minerals (table). Uncooked amaranth is particularly rich in manganese (159% DV), phosphorus (80% DV), magnesium (70% DV), iron (59% DV), and selenium (34% DV). Cooking decreases its nutritional value substantially across all nutrients, with only dietary minerals remaining at moderate levels. Cooked amaranth leaves are a rich source of vitamin A, vitamin C, calcium, and manganese, with moderate levels of folate, iron, magnesium, and potassium. Amaranth does not contain gluten.

History 
The native range of the genus is cosmopolitan. In pre-Hispanic times, amaranth was cultivated by the Aztec and their tributary communities in a quantity very similar to maize. Another important use of amaranth throughout Mesoamerica was in ritual drinks and foods. To this day, amaranth grains are toasted much like popcorn and mixed with honey, molasses, or chocolate to make a treat called , meaning "joy" in Spanish.

While all species are believed to be native to the New World, several have been cultivated and introduced to warm regions worldwide. Amaranth's cosmopolitan distribution makes it one of many plants providing evidence of pre-Columbian oceanic contact. The earliest archeological evidence for amaranth in the Old World was found in an excavation in Narhan, India, dated to 1000–800 BCE.

Because of its importance as a symbol of indigenous culture, its palatability, ease of cooking, and a protein that is particularly well-suited to human nutritional needs, interest in amaranth seeds (especially A. cruentus and A. hypochondriacus) revived in the 1970s. It was recovered in Mexico from wild varieties and is now commercially cultivated. It is a popular snack in Mexico, sometimes mixed with chocolate or puffed rice, and its use has spread to Europe and other parts of North America.

Seed 
Several species are raised for amaranth "grain" in Asia and the Americas. Amaranth and its relative quinoa are considered pseudocereals because of their similarities to cereals in flavor and cooking. The spread of Amaranthus is of a joint effort of human expansion, adaptation, and fertilization strategies. Grain amaranth has been used for food by humans in several ways. The grain can be ground into a flour for use like other grain flours. It can be popped like popcorn, or flaked like oatmeal.

Seeds of Amaranth grain have been found in Antofagasta de la Sierra Department, Catamarca, Argentina in the southern Puna desert of the north of Argentina dating from 4,500 years ago, with evidence suggesting earlier use. Archeological evidence of seeds from A. hypochondriacus and A. crutenus found in a cave in Tehuacán, Mexico, suggests amaranth was part of Aztec civilization in the 1400s.

Ancient amaranth grains still used include the three species Amaranthus caudatus, A. cruentus, and A. hypochondriacus. Evidence from single-nucleotide polymorphisms and chromosome structure supports A. hypochondriacus as the common ancestor of the three grain species.

It has been proposed as an inexpensive native crop that could be cultivated by indigenous people in rural areas for several reasons:
 A small amount of seed plants a large area (seeding rate 1 kg/ha).
 Yields are high compared to the seeding rate: 1,000 kg or more per hectare.
 It is easily harvested and easily processed, post harvest, as there are no hulls to remove.
 Its seeds are a source of protein.
 It has rich content of the dietary minerals, calcium, magnesium, phosphorus, and potassium.
 In cooked and edible forms, amaranth retains adequate content of several dietary minerals.
 It is easy to cook. Boil in water with twice the amount of water as grain by volume (or 2.4 times as much water by weight). Amaranth seed can also be popped one tablespoon at a time in a hot pan without oil, shaken every few seconds to avoid burning.
 It grows fast and, in three cultivated species, the large seedheads can weigh up to 1 kg and contain a half-million small seeds.

In the United States, the amaranth crop is mostly used for seed production. Most amaranth in American food products starts as a ground flour, blended with wheat or other flours to create cereals, crackers, cookies, bread or other baked products. Despite utilization studies showing that amaranth can be blended with other flours at levels above 50% without affecting functional properties or taste, most commercial products use amaranth only as a minor portion of their ingredients despite them being marketed as "amaranth" products.

Leaves, roots, and stems 

Amaranth species are cultivated and consumed as a leaf vegetable in many parts of the world. Four species of Amaranthus are documented as cultivated vegetables in eastern Asia: Amaranthus cruentus, Amaranthus blitum, Amaranthus dubius, and Amaranthus tricolor.

Asia 
In Indonesia and Malaysia, leaf amaranth is called  (although the word has since been loaned to refer to spinach, in a different genus).

In Uttar Pradesh and Bihar in India, it is called  and is a popular red leafy vegetable (referred to in the class of vegetable preparations called ). It is called chua in Kumaun area of Uttarakhand, where it is a popular red-green vegetable. In Karnataka in India, it is called  . It is used to prepare curries such as hulee, palya, majjigay-hulee, and so on. In Kerala, it is called cheera and is consumed by stir-frying the leaves with spices and red chili peppers to make a dish called cheera thoran. In Tamil Nadu, it is called  and is regularly consumed as a favourite dish, where the greens are steamed and mashed with light seasoning of salt, red chili pepper, and cumin. It is called . In the states of Andhra Pradesh and Telangana and other Telugu speaking regions of the country, this leaf is called as "Thotakura" and is cooked as a standalone curry, added as a part of mix leafy vegetable curry or added in preparation of a popular dal called  in (Telugu). In Maharashtra, it is called  and is available in both red and white colour. In Orissa, it is called , it is used to prepare , in which the leaf is fried with chili and onions. In West Bengal, the green variant is called  and the red variant is called .

In China, the leaves and stems are used as a stir-fry vegetable, or in soups. In Vietnam, it is called  and is used to make soup.

Africa 
A traditional food plant in Africa, amaranth has the potential to improve nutrition, boost food security, foster rural development and support sustainable land care.

In Bantu regions of Uganda and western Kenya, it is known as doodo or litoto. It is also known among the Kalenjin as a drought crop (chepkerta). In Nigeria, it is a common vegetable and goes with all Nigerian starch dishes. In Botswana, it is referred to as morug and cooked as a staple green vegetable.

Europe 
It is boiled, then served with olive oil and lemon juice like a salad, sometimes alongside fried fish. Greeks stop harvesting the plant (which also grows wild) when it starts to bloom at the end of August.

Americas 

In the Caribbean, the leaves are called bhaji in Trinidad and callaloo in Jamaica, and are sautéed with onions, garlic, and tomatoes, or sometimes used in a soup called pepperpot soup.

Oil
Making up about 5% of the total fatty acids of amaranth, squalene is extracted as a vegetable-based alternative to the more expensive shark oil for use in dietary supplements and cosmetics.

Dyes 
The flowers of the 'Hopi Red Dye' amaranth were used by the Hopi (a tribe in the western United States) as the source of a deep red dye. Also a synthetic dye was named "amaranth" for its similarity in color to the natural amaranth pigments known as betalains. This synthetic dye is also known as Red No. 2 in North America and E123 in the European Union.

Ornamentals 

The genus also contains several well-known ornamental plants, such as Amaranthus caudatus (love-lies-bleeding), a vigorous, hardy annual with dark purplish flowers crowded in handsome drooping spikes. Another Indian annual, A. hypochondriacus (prince's feather), has deeply veined, lance-shaped leaves, purple on the under face, and deep crimson flowers densely packed on erect spikes.

Amaranths are recorded as food plants for some Lepidoptera (butterfly and moth) species including the nutmeg moth and various case-bearer moths of the genus Coleophora: C. amaranthella, C. enchorda (feeds exclusively on Amaranthus), C. immortalis (feeds exclusively on Amaranthus), C. lineapulvella, and C. versurella (recorded on A. spinosus).

Culture 
Diego Durán described the festivities for the Aztec god . People decorated their homes and trees with paper flags; ritual races, processions, dances, songs, prayers, and finally human sacrifices were held. This was one of the more important Aztec festivals, and the people prepared for the whole month. They fasted or ate very little; a statue of the god was made out of amaranth seeds and honey, and at the end of the month, it was cut into small pieces so everybody could eat a piece of the god. After the Spanish conquest, cultivation of amaranth was outlawed, while some of the festivities were subsumed into the Christmas celebration.

Amaranth is associated with longevity and, poetically, with death and immortality. Amaranth garlands were used in the mourning of Achilles.

John Milton's Paradise Lost portrays a showy amaranth in the Garden of Eden, "remov'd from Heav'n" when it blossoms because the flowers "shade the fountain of life". He describes amaranth as "immortal" in reference to the flowers that generally do not wither and retain bright reddish tones of color, even when deceased; referred to in one species as "love-lies-bleeding."

Gallery

See also
 Ancient grains

References

Further reading
 Howard, Brian Clark. "Amaranth: Another Ancient Wonder Food, But Who Will Eat It?". National Geographic Online, August 12, 2013.
 Fanton M., Fanton J. Amaranth The Seed Savers' Handbook. (1993)
 Assad, R., Reshi, Z. A., Jan, S., & Rashid, I. (2017). Biology of amaranths. The Botanical Review, 83(4), 382–436.

External links

 Grain amaranth, Crops For A Future

 
Leaf vegetables
Tropical agriculture
Asian vegetables
Pseudocereals
E-number additives